A Dipset X-Mas is a Christmas-themed hip hop compilation album by American rapper Jim Jones and his ByrdGang music group, released on December 5, 2006. This album features the remix of Jim Jones' "We Fly High."

Track listing

Charts

References

Jim Jones (rapper) albums
Christmas compilation albums
2006 Christmas albums
Christmas albums by American artists
E1 Music compilation albums
Diplomat Records albums